Jerry Ahlin (born August 12, 1945) was a Canadian football linebacker who played for the Hamilton Tiger-Cats of the Canadian Football League. He played in one game in 1969.

After college at the University of Idaho where he played defensive end and quarterback, Jerry was signed by the Dallas Cowboys but was the last player cut before the season began. He was sent to play with the Oklahoma City Plainsmen 1967, a member of the Professional Football League of America. As a minor league team, the Plainsmen had a working agreement with the Cowboys.

References 

1945 births
Living people
American football linebackers
Canadian football linebackers
Idaho Vandals football players
Hamilton Tiger-Cats players